Dwaipayan Bhattacharjee (born 2 November 1993) is an Indian cricketer. He made his List A debut for Tripura in the 2016–17 Vijay Hazare Trophy on 25 February 2017. He made his first-class debut on 3 January 2020, for Tripura in the 2019–20 Ranji Trophy.

References

External links
 

1993 births
Living people
Indian cricketers
Tripura cricketers
Place of birth missing (living people)